Jahrom University of Medical Sciences (JUMS), is a public medical university located in the city of Jahrom, Fars Province, south of Iran. Jums was established in 1977 and currently is the second top medical university in the province. The university has three faculties, four hospitals and six research centres with more than 1200 students and 120 faculty staffs.

History
The foundation of Jahrom university of medical sciences dates back to 1977 when Shiraz University of Medical Sciences established a medical school in Jahrom and admitted 40 medical students. Following the 1979 Islamic revolution of Iran the university suspended for almost 7 years and began its work again in 1986 by admitting 90 medical and 20 nursing students. 10 years later in 1996, the medical school of Jahrom dissented from Shiraz University of Medical Sciences and promoted to the independent "Jahrom school of medical sciences". The school promoted to "Jahrom university of medical sciences" in 2007.

Currently, the number of academic members at the University of Medical Sciences is 121. At present, over 1200 students of various disciplines and levels are studying in the university.

Faculties and Research Centres 

The faculties Jahrom university of medical sciences include:
 Faculty of Medicine, 1977
 Faculty of Nursing & Midwifery, 1986
 Faculty of Para-medicine, 1987
There are six working in the university:
 Medical Ethics Research Centre
 Non-Communicable Diseases Research Centre
 Anaesthesiology and Pain Control Research Centre
 Women's Health and Diseases Research Centre
 Social Factors Affecting Health Research Centre
 Human-Animal Common Diseases Research Centre

Hospitals 
The university manages or supervises four hospitals including Seyyedoshohada, Ostad Motahhari, Peymanieh in Jahrom and Bab Anar Khatam-olanbia, as well as all urban and rural health centers and clinics in Jahrom and Khafr counties.

See also 
 Jahrom University
 Islamic Azad University, Jahrom Branch

References

External links
Official website
Jahrom School of Medicine

Education in Jahrom
Medical schools in Iran
Universities in Iran
1977 establishments in Iran
Educational institutions established in 1977
Buildings and structures in Jahrom